Hudson Grist Mill, also known as Crotsley Mill, is a historic grist mill located at Saltillo in Huntingdon County, Pennsylvania. It sits on a rubble stone foundation and has clapboard siding. An elevator head is housed in centrally placed extra story. Attached to the mill is a two-story frame addition.

It was listed on the National Register of Historic Places in 1990.

References 

Grinding mills on the National Register of Historic Places in Pennsylvania
Industrial buildings completed in 1850
Buildings and structures in Huntingdon County, Pennsylvania
Historic buildings and structures in the United States
Grinding mills in Pennsylvania
National Register of Historic Places in Huntingdon County, Pennsylvania